Badminton competitions at the 2023 Pan American Games in Santiago, Chile will be held between October 21 and 25, 2023 at the Olympic Training Center, located in Ñuñoa.

Five medal events will be contested: singles and doubles for men and women and a mixed doubles event. A total of 90 athletes will compete.

The event awarded ranking points towards selection for the 2024 Summer Olympics in Paris, France.

Qualification

A total of 90 athletes (45 men and 45 women) will qualify to compete at the games. A nation may enter a maximum of four athletes per gender. As host nation, Chile automatically qualified a full team of eights athletes. All other quotas will be awarded through the team world rankings as of May 2, 2023. Each nation's highest ranked athlete/pair's points in each of the five events will be added to determine a country's point total. The top three ranked will qualify eight athletes, the next four countries will qualify six each (three per gender) and the next four after that will qualify four each (two per gender). All other nations will qualify one athlete each, until the quota per gender is reached. The gold medalists in both Men’s Singles and the Women’s Singles in the 2021 Junior Pan American Games received a direct quota for the Santiago 2023 Pan American Games, which will not be part of the maximum quota specified within the qualification process for these Games.

Participating nations
A total of 2 countries qualified athletes so far. The number of athletes a nation entered is in parentheses beside the name of the country.

Medal summary

Medalists

See also
Badminton at the 2023 Parapan American Games
Badminton at the 2024 Summer Olympics

References

Events at the 2023 Pan American Games
Pan American Games
2023
Badminton in Chile